Murray Island Airport  is an airport on Murray Island, in Queensland, Australia.

Airlines and destinations

See also
 List of airports in Queensland

References

 
 

Airports in Queensland
Torres Strait Islands communities